Mark White is a retired American soccer goalkeeper who played professionally in the Allsvenskan, Major Indoor Soccer League and Southwest Independent Soccer League.

In 1980, White signed with the expansion Baltimore Blast of the Major Indoor Soccer League.  He moved to the Philadelphia Fever in 1981.  That year, he was a member of the United States men's national under-20 soccer team at the 1981 FIFA World Youth Championship.  He was an unused substitute in all three American games.  In 1986, White joined Hammarby IF of the Swedish Allsvenskan.  He started thirteen games, then was sent on loan to the Dallas Sidekicks.  Hammarby released him at the end of the season and White remained in the Dallas area.  In 1990 and 1991, he played for the Fort Worth Kickers of the Southwest Independent Soccer League.

External links
 MISL stats
Svala snöflingor, varm glögg och kärleken till en clown
Dallas Sidekicks: Mark White

References

Living people
1961 births
American soccer players
American expatriate soccer players
Baltimore Blast (1980–1992) players
Dallas Sidekicks (original MISL) players
DFW Tornados players
Hammarby Fotboll players
Major Indoor Soccer League (1978–1992) players
USISL players
Allsvenskan players
Soccer players from Louisiana
Sportspeople from New Orleans
Philadelphia Fever (MISL) players
United States men's under-20 international soccer players
Expatriate footballers in Sweden
Association football goalkeepers